James Roy ("Jimmy") Smith (1904-1986) was California water polo player and coach. He developed many of the modern rules which are used in competition today, including the use of the yellow rubberized ball adopted by FINA in 1956. 

Smith authored several books on aquatic coaching and the mechanics of play. His 1936 book, Playing and Coaching Water Polo, was the first text on the sport. At the same time, Smith developed a water polo ball made with an inflatable bladder and a rubber fabric cover, which improved performance.

In 1990, the United States Water Polo Award was established in memory of Jimmie Smith and his contributions to the sport of water polo. The award is given annually to an individual or group, recognizing outstanding contributions to water polo in the United States. The trophy is exhibited at the International Swimming Hall of Fame.

See also
 List of members of the International Swimming Hall of Fame
 Water polo ball
 Monte Nitzkowski was coached by James R. Smith.

References
International Swimming Hall of Fame biography
US Water Polo Hall of Fame

American water polo coaches